Slavonski Šamac is a village and municipality located on the river Sava in Croatia. It is located in Brod-Posavina county in the region of Slavonia. On the opposite side of the river lies the Bosnian town of Šamac. Slavonski Šamac is located on the D7 road, a part of the European route E73.

Demographics 
According to the 2011 census, the municipality had a population of 2,169 with 996 in the settlement of Slavonski Šamac itself.

The municipality consists of two settlements:

 Kruševica, population 1,173
 Slavonski Šamac, population 996

References

Bosnia and Herzegovina–Croatia border crossings
Populated places in Brod-Posavina County
Municipalities of Croatia